Queens College Boys' High School, more commonly referred to as Queen's College (or simply QC), is a fee-paying public school for boys situated in the town of Queenstown, Eastern Cape. Established in 1858 first as Prospect House Academy, it is the oldest school in the Border region and among the 100 oldest schools in South Africa.  The college is associated  with Queen's College Boys' Junior School, which was established on 15 November 1957, a year before the high school marked 100 years of existence.

History 
Queen's College started as Prospect House Academy when Mr C.E Ham first opened the doors to his school on 21 April 1858 at 6 Shepstone Street in Queenstown. The school was situated in an outbuilding on the property and consisted of a single room with a mud floor and holes in the wall for ventilation. The enrollment had reached 30 boys by 1859 and was also known as the Queenstown District School. It was in receipt of a government grant of £50, backdated to the initial opening of the school. From inception the school offered boarding facilities, in the home of Mr Ham, conveniently situated directly across the road from the schoolhouse.

In 1864, a dispute regarding financial support for the school by the district council, led to the abrupt closure of the school by Mr Ham and he ceased teaching in order to open a general store in the town. Boys returning from their holiday in July 1864 discovered that their school house had been let to another tenant and their schoolmaster had become a haberdasher. Public concern was such that a committee was formed, which decides that St Michael's Grammar School should assume the mantle of Prospect House Academy by accepting the status of a government-aided school. The resulting amalgamated school becomes the Public School for Boys and classes are held in a billiard hall.

It was only in 1910 that the school was renamed Queen's College.

Headmasters 
Mr. CE Ham (1858–1864)
Mr. G Elliot (1864–1865)
Mr. R McCormick (1865–1867)
Mr. Frederic John Beswick (1867–1899)
Mr. B Noaks (1899–1900)
Mr. GFH Clark (1901–1904)
Mr. H Wilkinson (1904–1929)
Mr. A Parry-Davies (1930–1939)
Mr. HQ Davies (1940–1964)
Mr. TW Higgs (1965–1973)
Mr. DH Schroeder (1974–1992)
Mr. CP Harker (1993–2010)
Mr. DCP Lovatt (2011–2012)
Mr. BJ Grant (2013–2017)
Mr. J van der Ryst (2018–present)

School facilities
4 science and biology labs
Design and Technology facility
Media centre
Library
Music centre
4 full sized cricket fields
8 turf wickets for practices
3 indoor cricket nets
2 squash courts
7 rugby fields
400m Cinder athletes track
1 floodlit AstroTurf
50m swimming pool
Water polo pool
2 basketball courts
Gym
School Hall
Memorial Hall

Hostels
The school has currently has three hostels; Whitson House, Athlone House and Connaught House. Whitson caters for students in Grades 8–9, Connaught for students in Grades 10–12 and Athlone for Students in Grades 9-10. Athlone was reopened in 2021 after many years of closure. All hostel boys belong to as Beswick House, a name taken from the school's fourth headmaster.

Originally, Whitson House was the first hostel of the school and was built in 1904. It was later renamed Connaught House. In 1932, this hostel was closed leading to the later opening of hostels Athlone and De Vos Malan in 1939. In 1975, Connaught House was renamed Whitson House after old boy Mr H Whitson. The new Connaught House was built in 1979.  
After a decline in Boarders in the early 2000s most of the hostels were closed and converted into classrooms. Hostels outside campus were sold.

Sports and cultural programmes

Sports
The main sports fields are the Queen’s College Victoria Recreation Grounds (rugby and athletics) and the Chris Harker Astro (hockey) where first team matches are played. The naming of the astroturf being a misnomer which suggests that it is soley owned by the school, when it is actually a shared facility amongst local schools. 
Athletics
Basketball
Chess 
Cricket
Cross country
Hockey
Rugby
Soccer 
Squash
Swimming
Tennis

Cultural
Agronomy Club 
Adventure Club
Brass Band
Marimba Band
Blood Peer Promotors
Chess Society
Choir
Computer Club
Debating Society & Public Speaking
Do It Yourself (DIY)
Drama
Driver Training
Ecowatch
First Aid Society
Queen's Gym
Interact Club
Library Society
Photographic Society
The Queen's Quote
Representative Council of Learners (RCL)
Students' Christian Association (SCA)

Notable Old Boys

Sport

Rugby and Cricket

Other sports 
 Glen Dell, Advanced World Aerobatic Champion in 2004 and Red Bull Air Race competitor (1974)
 Le-Neal Jackson, South African field hockey player

Business and the arts 
 Allister Sparks, journalist, author and former editor of The Rand Daily Mail (1950)
 Alan Scholefield, journalist and writer (1947)
Don Pinnock, criminologist, naturalist and journalist (1965)
 Gideon Khobane, CEO of SuperSport (1995)
Gary Hartley, writer, director, producer, editor and  2021 Mail and Guardian Top 200 Eminent and Accomplished Young South Africans (2004)
Loyiso Mkize, visual artist, creator of "Kwezi" - South Africa's first ever superhero and artist for DC comics (2005)
Ayabonga Cawe, economist, broadcaster and author (2008)

Politics 
Errol K. Moorcroft, Progressive Federal Party  and Democratic Party (South Africa) politician, MP for Albany district 1981–1987, 1989–1994 (1956)

Military 
 John ("Jack") Sherwood Kelly, VC CMG DSO, recipient of the Victoria Cross (also attended Dale College, Selborne College and St. Andrews College)
Norman Walsh, Rhodesian and Zimbabwean air marshal (1949)

References

Schools in the Eastern Cape
Educational institutions established in 1858
Boarding schools in South Africa
1858 establishments in the British Empire
Enoch Mgijima Local Municipality